The 1938 Creighton Bluejays football team was an American football team that represented Creighton University as a member of the Missouri Valley Conference (MVC) during the 1938 college football season. In its fourth season under head coach Marchmont Schwartz, the team compiled a 6–1–1 record (1–0–1 against MVC opponents) and outscored opponents by a total of 179 to 40. The team played its home games at Creighton Stadium in Omaha, Nebraska.

Schedule

References

Creighton
Creighton Bluejays football seasons
Creighton Bluejays football